Adivar is an impact crater on Venus, named in honor of Turkish writer Halide Edib Adıvar. The crater is located just north of the western Aphrodite highland (9 degrees north latitude, 76 degrees east longitude). Surrounding the crater rim is ejected material which appears bright in the radar image due to the presence of rough fractured rock. A much broader area has also been affected by the impact, particularly to the west of the crater. A darker streak, in a horseshoe or paraboloidal shape, surrounds the bright area. Radar-dark (i.e., smooth) paraboloidal streaks were observed around craters in earlier Magellan images, but this is a rare bright crater streak. These unusual streaks, seen only on Venus, are believed to result from the interaction of crater materials (the meteoroid, ejecta, or both) and high-speed winds in the upper atmosphere. The precise mechanism that produces the streaks is poorly understood, but it is clear that the dense atmosphere of Venus plays an important role in the distribution of the ejected material.

References
 Jet Propulsion Laboratory. Catalog Page for PIA00083. Catalog Page for PIA00083 Retrieved 4 September 2009.

External links
 Magellan image

Impact craters on Venus